Federal Highway 51 (Carretera Federal 51) (Fed. 51) is a free (libre) part of the federal highways corridors (los corredores carreteros federales) of Mexico. Fed. 51 has two segments: the first segment run from Ojuelos de Jalisco to Maravatío, Michoacán. The length of the first segment is 309.41 km (192.26 mi). The second segment runs from Zitácuaro, Michoacán to Iguala, Guerrero. The length of the second segment is 399.05 km (247.96 mi).

References

051